State elections were held in South Australia on 8 April 1933. All 46 seats in the South Australian House of Assembly were up for election. The incumbent Parliamentary Labor Party government led by Premier Robert Richards was defeated by the opposition Liberal and Country League led by Leader of the Opposition Richard L. Butler. Each district elected multiple members.

Background
After the ALP government of Premier Lionel Hill endorsed the controversial Premiers' Plan following the start of the Great Depression in Australia and the subsequent Australian Labor Party split of 1931, the ALP state executive expelled 23 of the 30 members of the ALP caucus, including the entire cabinet.  The expelled MPs formed the Parliamentary Labor Party (also known as Premiers Plan Labor), with Hill as leader and Premier, and continued in office with the support of the Butler-led Liberal Federation.

Amid increasing riots and protests, as well as skyrocketing unemployment, Hill left politics to become Australian Agent-General to the United Kingdom.  He was succeeded by Robert Richards, who had the impossible task of leading the government into the election.

In contrast to the ructions in Labor, the conservative forces in the state presented a united front at the 1931 federal election, when all anti-Labor major party candidates in the state ran under the banner of the Emergency Committee of South Australia. This grouping took an additional two seats to hold six of the state's seven seats in the federal House of Representatives and all three available seats in the bloc-voting winner-take-all Senate. In 1932, buoyed by this success, the Liberal Federation and the Country Party merged as the Liberal and Country League under Butler's leadership.

With three Labor factions—the official ALP, Premiers Plan Labor and Lang Labor—splitting the combined 47.8% total Labor vote, the result was a landslide victory for the LCL.  The LCL won 29 seats versus only 13 for the three Labor factions combined. Though the Labor split in South Australia would only last until 1934, this would be the start of 32 years of LCL government in South Australia—one of the longest unbroken runs for a governing party in the Commonwealth. The LCL would stay in office until the 1965 state election with the assistance of a pro-LCL electoral malapportionment known as the Playmander, which would be introduced in 1936.

Results

|}

See also
Results of the South Australian state election, 1933 (House of Assembly)
Candidates of the South Australian state election, 1933
Members of the South Australian House of Assembly, 1933-1938
Members of the South Australian Legislative Council, 1933–1938

References
History of South Australian elections 1857-2006, volume 1: ECSA
State and federal election results  in Australia since 1890

Specific

Elections in South Australia
1933 elections in Australia
1930s in South Australia
April 1933 events